"I Wish I Were Only Lonely" is a song recorded by Canadian country music artist Michelle Wright. It was released in 1989 as the fifth single from her debut album, Do Right by Me. It peaked at number 7 on the RPM Country Tracks chart in June 1989.

The song was also recorded by American country music artist Reba McEntire on her 1988 album Reba.

Chart performance

Year-end charts

References

1989 singles
Michelle Wright songs
Songs written by Steve Bogard
Songs written by Rick Giles
Reba McEntire songs
1988 songs